Eureka Street is an Australian magazine concerned with public affairs, arts, and theology. Founded in 1991, the magazine was published in print format for 15 years before becoming an online-only magazine in 2006.

The magazine is part of Jesuit Communications, the communications arm of the Australian Jesuit Province. However, the magazine has a tradition of being strongly secular and inclusive.

Morag Fraser was editor of Eureka Street from 1991 till 2003. Tim Kroenert held the position until early 2020, when David Halliday became editor, alongside editorial consultant Andrew Hamilton.

Writers
Writers published in the magazine have included Margaret Simons, Peter Roebuck, Brett McBean, Frank Brennan, Gregory O'Kelly, Clive Hamilton, Susan Crennan and Stuart Macintyre.

References

External links
Official website
Jesuit Communications

1991 establishments in Australia
2006 disestablishments in Australia
Catholic magazines
Defunct magazines published in Australia
Jesuit publications
Magazines established in 1991
Magazines disestablished in 2006
Online magazines with defunct print editions